Organtino Scaroli, also Organtino Scazola, (died 1572) was a Roman Catholic prelate who served as Bishop of San Marco (Argentano) (1569-1572).

Biography
On 1 April 1569, Organtino Scaroli was appointed during the papacy of Pope Pius V as Bishop of San Marco (Argentano).
On 16 April 1569, he was consecrated bishop by Scipione Rebiba, Cardinal-Priest of Sant'Angelo in Pescheria, with Giulio Antonio Santorio, Archbishop of Santa Severina, and Thomas Goldwell, Bishop of Saint Asaph, serving as co-consecrators. He served as Bishop of San Marco (Argentano) until his death in 1572.

References

External links and additional sources
 (for Chronology of Bishops) 
 (for Chronology of Bishops) 

16th-century Italian Roman Catholic bishops
Bishops appointed by Pope Pius V
1572 deaths